Boica is the Hungarian name for two places in Romania:

 Băiţa Commune, Hunedoara County
 Boiţa village, Răchitova Commune, Hunedoara County